Who Is This Bitch, Anyway? is an album by American vocalist Marlena Shaw recorded in 1974 and released on the Blue Note label.

Reception
The Allmusic review by Jason Ankeny awarded the album 4½ stars stating "A record as fierce and blunt as its title portends, Who Is This Bitch, Anyway? vaults Marlena Shaw into a brave new world of feminism and funk, updating the sophisticated soul-jazz approach of her previous records to explore a fast-changing musical, political, and sexual landscape... Not only Shaw's best-selling Blue Note release, Who Is This Bitch, Anyway? represents her creative apex as well".

Track listing
 "You, Me and Ethel / Street Walking Woman" (Marlena Shaw / Loonis McGlohon, Byron Olson) - 6:20 
 "You Taught Me How to Speak in Love" (Molly Ann Leiken, Art Munson) - 3:52 
 "Davy" (Benard Ighner) - 5:26 
 "Feel Like Makin' Love" (Eugene McDaniels) - 5:00 
 "The Lord Giveth and the Lord Taketh Away" (Shaw) - 1:05 
 "You Been Away Too Long" (Ighner) - 3:07 
 "You" (Shaw) - 3:45 
 "Loving You Was Like a Party" (Ighner) - 4:17 
 "A Prelude for Rose Marie" (Olson) - 1:56 
 "Rose Marie (Mon Cherie)" (Wilma Callender, Ighner) - 4:19
Recorded on June 12 (tracks 3 & 5), December 3 (tracks 2 & 8), December 4 (tracks 6 & 7), December 5 (tracks 1 & 4) and December 6 (tracks 9 & 10), 1974.

Personnel
Marlena Shaw - vocals
Benard Ighner - piano, flugelhorn, arranger
Michael Lang, Bill Mays - piano
Larry Nash - electric piano, synthesizer   
Dennis Budimir, Larry Carlton, David T. Walker - guitar
Chuck Domanico - bass 
Chuck Rainey - electric bass
Harvey Mason - drums, wind chimes
Jim Gordon - drums
King Errison - conga
Dale Oehler, Byron Olson - arranger
Unidentified strings, horns and woodwinds

References

Blue Note Records albums
Marlena Shaw albums
1975 albums